The nominations for the 20th Vancouver Film Critics Circle Awards, honoring the best in filmmaking in 2019, were announced on December 16, 2019. Winners in the international categories were announced on December 16, and winners in the Canadian film categories were announced on January 6, 2020.

Winners and nominees

International

Canadian

References

External links
 

2019
2019 film awards
2019 in Canadian cinema
2019 in British Columbia